No Molestar (Eng.: "Do Not Disturb") is the eighth studio album released by Marco Antonio Solís on October 7, 2008. This album became the ninth number-one set on the Billboard Top Latin Albums for Solís, the most for any artist on the chart.

Track listing

All songs written and composed by Marco Antonio Solís

Chart performance

Sales and certifications

References

2008 albums
Marco Antonio Solís albums
Spanish-language albums
Fonovisa Records albums